Dagfinn Bakke (16 August 1933 – 1 January 2019) was a Norwegian painter, illustrator and printmaker.

Career
Bakke was born in Lødingen, and settled in Svolvær. From 1952 he worked as illustrator for the magazine Magasinet For Alle. From 1956 to 1992 he was appointed as illustrator for the newspaper Lofotposten, where he had a regular column which he signed as DAN. He illustrated several books, and is represented at the National Gallery of Norway and other art galleries.

His book illustrations include several humorous books by Arthur Arntzen.

Bakke was biographed by Bjørn Tore Pedersen in 2013.

Awards
In 1983, his caricature of Margaret Thatcher, pictured as a besom-riding witch escorted home from the Falkland Islands by British aircraft, won first prize at the International Salon of Cartoons in Montreal.

References

Further reading

1933 births
2019 deaths
People from Lødingen
People from Vågan
Norwegian illustrators
Norwegian printmakers
Norwegian editorial cartoonists
Norwegian caricaturists
Norwegian columnists
20th-century Norwegian painters
21st-century Norwegian painters
Norwegian male painters
20th-century Norwegian male artists
21st-century Norwegian male artists